Vøringsfossen is the 83rd highest waterfall in Norway on the basis of total fall. It lies at the top of the Måbødalen valley in the municipality of Eidfjord, in Vestland county. It is located near Norwegian National Road 7, which connects Oslo with Bergen. It is perhaps the most famous in the country and a major tourist attraction on the way down from Hardangervidda to Hardangerfjord.

There are several warning signs in regard to the dangers of falling to one's death. Other measures for preventing deaths were planned for implementation in the spring of 2015, and a stairway bridge opened in 2020.

Name
The name Vøringsfossen is derived from the verb vyrða (English: esteem, revere). The last element fossen, the definite form of foss (waterfall), is a later addition.

History
The waterfall was hardly known by anyone other than locals until 1821. In 1893 it was measured with a string, and the real height was revealed to be .

In 1880 Ola Garen decided to build a hotel at top of the waterfall. The only way up there was a path with 1,500 stairs up Måbøbjerget together with a bridle path that had been built in 1872 to carry English tourists to the waterfall. In 1891 a new road with tunnels was built along Eidfjordvandet, and in the same year the Fossli Hotel was finished, designed in Art Nouveau style by architect Frederik Konow Lund. All materials for the construction had to be carried on horseback from Eidfjord up to the top of the hill. Around the year 1900 large cruise ships began to visit Eidfjord, and from there passengers were transported by horse and wagon up the valley.

The composer Edvard Grieg had a log cabin nearby and was a frequent visitor to the falls.

Hydroelectric
The Bjoreio, the small river that flows into Vøringsfossen has a hydroelectric dam in the Sysendalen valley above the falls.

Pedestrian bridge
A pedestrian bridge has been placed across the ravine in sections by helicopter. One side is sixteen metres higher than the other, and its length is 47 metres. The design is by Carl-Viggo Holmebakk. An article in Dagsavisen described it as a bridge reminiscent of "a collapsed scaffold for construction, across" the ravine.

See also
List of waterfalls

References

External links
 
 Vøringfossen in June on YouTube
 Voringfossen Official Website

Eidfjord
Waterfalls of Vestland